Binot Bibi Mosque is the earliest surviving mosque in Dhaka built in 1454 by Bakht Binat, the daughter of Marhamat. It was built during the rule of the Sultan of Bengal, Nasiruddin Mahmud Shah (1435–1459). Binat Bibi Mosque is the earliest surviving mosque in Dhaka built in 1454 by Bakht Binat, the daughter of Marhamat. The mosque is located beside the Hayat Bepari’s Bridge in Narinda area.

The mosque is a square, single domed measuring 12 feet (3.7 m) square internally with a single hemispherical dome, at the top of the square room. Entrances are from east, north and south. Pre-Mughal features included the curved cornices and battlements, corner octagonal turrets, and arches on the south, north and eastern sides. The ornamentation is modest and the building is coated with plaster.

Part of the mosque is being demolished as part of a renovation plan which includes building a 70-foot (21 m) high minaret, and the extension of the current building from three stories to seven.

Structure
The mosque is a square, single domed mosque measuring  square internally with a single hemispherical dome atop the square room. Entrances are from east, north and south. Pre-Mughal features included  the curved cornices and  battlements, corner octagonal turrets, and arches on the south, north and eastern sides. The ornamentation is modest and the building is coated with plaster. There is a stone inscription of the mosque written in Farsi (Persian) which is located on the north of the mosque where Binat Bakht is buried. The wall thickness is approximately 1.82m. The mihrab had a projection at the back of the west wall.

The single dome mosque over time was turned into a rectangular shape by breaking down the southern wall and extending to the south. Further a new dome was added around 1932. In 1962, towards the western side a new mihrab was built. With time the original pre-Mughal features were changed, the outer façade of the western veranda, the northern wall, the dome and the side walls of the waterbody were decorated with traditional vernacular chinitukri work (ceramic or glass shard tiling). The renovated walls didn't have the original structure thickness hence the existing structure can be identified.  Currently the only pre-Mughal features are the inscription, the eastern wall, the northern wall, the original dome, and the curved cornice.

Current state 

Gallery

See also
 List of mosques in Bangladesh

References

External links 

 City's heritage buildings

1454 establishments in Asia
15th-century mosques
Mosques in Dhaka
Religious buildings and structures completed in 1454